Start the Revolution Without Me is a 1970 British-French-American period comedy film directed by Bud Yorkin and starring Gene Wilder, Donald Sutherland, Hugh Griffith, Jack MacGowran, Billie Whitelaw, Orson Welles (playing himself as narrator) and Victor Spinetti. The comedy is set in revolutionary France where two peasants are mistaken for the famous Corsican Brothers. The film is considered a parody of a number of works of historical fiction about the French Revolution and French history in general, including A Tale of Two Cities (1859) by Charles Dickens and two works by Alexandre Dumas, The Corsican Brothers (1844) and The Man in the Iron Mask (1847).

Plot
Two sets of identical twins are accidentally switched at birth. One pair, Phillipe and Pierre DeSisi, are aristocratic and haughty, while the other, Charles and Claude Coupé, are poor and dim-witted. On the eve of the French Revolution, both sets find themselves entangled in palace intrigue.

Cast
 Gene Wilder as Phillipe/Claude
 Donald Sutherland as Pierre/Charles
 Hugh Griffith as Louis XVI
 Jack MacGowran as Jacques
 Billie Whitelaw as Marie Antoinette
 Victor Spinetti as Duke d'Escargot
 Ewa Aulin as Princess Christina
 Helen Fraser as Mimi Montage
 Rosalind Knight as Helene de Sisi
 Harry Fowler as Marcel
 Murray Melvin as Blind Man
 Graham Stark as Andre Coupe
 Orson Welles as The Narrator

Reception
Vincent Canby of The New York Times panned the film, writing: "The performances are desperate, without being in any way memorable, thus matching the wit of the screenplay."

Arthur D. Murphy of Variety called the film "disappointing," finding that "[t]he final mix never jells, despite some occasional, and genuine, hilarity ... There is a sluggishness and heaviness to some of the direction when the script is in good shape; and when the direction has lightness and zest, the script is in a slump."

Gene Siskel gave the film three-and-a-half stars out of four and declared it "a terribly funny parody of the over-stuffed 18th century costume dramas that crowd the vaults of many a major studio."

Charles Champlin of the Los Angeles Times praised the film as "an absolutely georgeous piece of costume kookery, a dazzling and sustained farce which is also a mad, affectionate tribute to every epee epic, every sabre-and-sex, bodice-and-bodkin historical melodrama anybody ever saw."

Gary Arnold of The Washington Post wrote that the film "is not without some oafish and wrong-headed touches, but on the whole it's a witty and engaging picture, an affectionate and competent revival of traditional farce."

Richard Combs of The Monthly Film Bulletin thought that Sutherland and Wilder "carry off an assortment of roles in lively fashion," but "the pacing of the film as a whole is unpleasantly jarring."

Awards
The film's screenwriters Fred Freeman and Lawrence J. Cohen were nominated for a WGA award for Best Comedy Written Directly for the Screen in 1971.

References

External links

 
 

1970 films
1970s historical comedy films
American historical comedy films
American parody films
French Revolution films
Cultural depictions of Louis XVI
Films about twin brothers
Films based on The Corsican Brothers
Films based on A Tale of Two Cities
Films directed by Bud Yorkin
Films scored by John Addison
Films shot in France
Films set in Corsica
Twins in fiction
Warner Bros. films
1970s parody films
1970 comedy films
1970s English-language films
1970s American films